Zanda Kalniņa-Lukaševica (born 30 June 1978) is a Latvian politician.

Since 2022 is a Deputy Speaker and Member of Parliament of Latvia.

Professional Experience 

In 2022 became a Deputy Speaker and a Member of Parliament of Latvia. Simultaneously, Zanda Kalniņa-Lukaševica is a part of a Committee of Foreign Affairs and a Committee of European Affairs. She was chosen as a Head of Latvian delegation of the Parliamentary Assembly of the Council of Europe, as well. 

In November 2014 Zanda Kalniņa-Lukaševica was appointed as Parliamentary Secretary of the Ministry of Foreign Affairs of the Republic of Latvia.

As Parliamentary Secretary Zanda Kalnina-Lukasevica  ensured communication of the Ministry of Foreign Affairs with the Latvian Parliament (Saeima) and European Parliament. She represented the government of Latvia at the EU Foreign Affairs Council meetings of Development Ministers and at the EU Foreign Affairs Council meetings of Trade Ministers. Since 2017 she chaired the Consultative Board for Development Cooperation Policy of Latvia. During the Latvian Presidency of the Council of the EU (2015) Kalnina-Lukasevica as Parliamentary State Secretary for EU Affairs represented the Council at the European Parliament's plenary sessions. 

In 2011, Zanda Kalniņa-Lukaševica was elected to the Parliament (Saeima) of Latvia and served as Chairperson of the European Affairs Committee (2011-2014) and a chairperson of the Innovation and Research Subcommittee, while serving also as a member of the Economic, Agricultural, Environmental and Regional Policy Committee of the parliament of Latvia. She played an active role during Latvia's accession process to the OECD. In 2016 Zanda Kalniņa-Lukasevica received an award of the Cabinet of Ministers for a significant contribution to ensuring Latvia’s successful accession to the OECD.

Between 2003 and 2008 she worked for the Ministry of Regional Development and Local Government, first, as Deputy Director of Local Government Development and Reform Department and then as Deputy State Secretary.

Kalniņa-Lukasevica started her professional career in 1998 at the City Council of Jūrmala.

Education 
Kalnina-Lukasevica holds a Doctoral degree (PhD) in Management Science with a focus on public administration from the Faculty of Economics and Management of the University of Latvia (2013). 

After having obtained her first academic degree in social work, in 2004 she obtained her master's degree at the Faculty of Economics and Management of the University of Latvia.

Zanda Kalniņa-Lukaševica speaks Latvian, English, German and Russian languages.

Civic activities 
Kalnina-Lukasevica is also known for her civic activities. She is a member of the boards of a non-profit organization “European Movement–Latvia”.

Kalniņa-Lukasevica is a member of the board of trusties of the Brussels based think tank “Friends of Europe”.

She is also 2017 European Young Leader in the Friends of Europe (EYL40) programme, and 2014 Munich Young Leader in the Munich Security Conference and Koerber Stiftung joint programme.

References

1978 births
Living people
Politicians from Riga
Reform Party (Latvia) politicians
New Unity politicians
Deputies of the 11th Saeima
Deputies of the 14th Saeima
University of Latvia alumni